Kijuro Yahagi (矢萩 喜從郎; born 1952) is a Japanese artist, designer, architect and photographer.

Biography 
Kijuro Yahagi was born in Yamagata Prefecture in 1952. He completed the graduate School of Science and Engineering, Waseda University.　He works on graphic design, conceptual art, photography, sculpture, architecture, furniture, sign design, publishing, etc.

Awards 

He won the special prize in 1980 and the gold prize in 1990 at the International Poster Biennale in Warsaw.

Works 
Since the 1980s, he has established an international reputation for his innovative design work, and he has developed a diverse range of genres of expression with his unique concept of modeling derived from the phenomenon of nystagmus (constant, minute, and involuntary movement of the eyeball). To trace Yahagi's contemplation and activities over a period of about 35 years, an exhibition was held at the Museum of Modern Art, Hayama from November 2021 to January 2022. The exhibition featured over 400 works and materials. The main works exhibited were HIDDEN JAPAN: a collection of photographs which was exhibited around the world from 1999 to 2012 as part of the Japan Foundation's overseas touring exhibition, conceptual art in the same format as a B1 size (728 x 1030 mm) poster, and graphic works that no one has ever produced before.

References

External links 

 Kijuro Yahagi Inc./ KIJURO YAHAGI AND ASSOCIATES INC., official site
 Kijuro Yahagi -CondeHouse
 HIDDEN JAPAN EXHIBITION -Tikotin Museum of Japanese Art

Living people
1952 births
Artists from Yamagata Prefecture
20th-century Japanese male artists
21st-century Japanese male artists
21st-century Japanese architects
20th-century Japanese architects
21st-century Japanese photographers
20th-century Japanese photographers